Pavel Zacha (born 6 April 1997) is a Czech professional ice hockey player for the Boston Bruins of the National Hockey League (NHL). Zacha was selected sixth overall by the New Jersey Devils in the 2015 NHL Entry Draft.

Playing career
Zacha played in the 2009 and 2010 Quebec International Pee-Wee Hockey Tournaments with his minor ice hockey team from Chomutov.

Zacha made his Czech Extraliga debut playing with HC Bílí Tygři Liberec during the 2013–14 Czech Extraliga season.

In the 2014 Canadian Hockey League Import Draft, Zacha was selected first overall by the Sarnia Sting of the Ontario Hockey League (OHL). He joined the Sting for the 2014–15 season, recording 34 points in 37 games. Zacha followed up in final season with the Sting recording 64 points in 51 games, OHL coaches awarded Zacha best penalty-killer in the Western Conference after his 2015–16 season.

In 2014, 2015, 2016 Zacha competed in the IIHF World Junior Championship with the Czech Republic.

Zacha was ranked eighth for North American skaters by the NHL Central Scouting Bureau for the 2015 NHL Entry Draft. He was selected sixth overall by the New Jersey Devils. On 11 August 2015, the Devils signed Zacha to a three-year, entry-level contract. He returned to the Sting for the 2015–16 season. Soon after the Sting season ended, Zacha joined the Devils. He made his NHL debut on 9 April 2016, recording two assists in a 5–1 win over the Toronto Maple Leafs.

Zacha made the Devils' lineup for the 2016–17 season. He scored his first NHL goal on 3 November 2016 in a 4–3 overtime loss to the Florida Panthers. He finished the season with eight goals and 24 points in 70 games.

After going pointless in ten games to start the 2018–19 season, Zacha was assigned to the Binghamton Devils of the American Hockey League (AHL) on 2 November 2018.

On 10 September 2019, Zacha signed a three-year extension with the Devils.

During the 2019–20 season Zacha recorded 32 points, a personal NHL career high.

On 13 July 2022, Zacha as a restricted free agent was traded by the Devils to the Boston Bruins in exchange for Erik Haula. In avoiding arbitration with the Bruins, Zacha was later signed to a one-year, $3.5 million contract for the 2022–23 season on 8 August 2022. On 14 January 2023, Zacha was signed to a four-year contract extension by the Bruins.

Career statistics

Regular season and playoffs

International

References

External links
 

1997 births
Living people
Albany Devils players
Binghamton Devils players
Boston Bruins players
Czech expatriate ice hockey players in Canada
Czech expatriate ice hockey players in the United States
Czech ice hockey centres
HC Benátky nad Jizerou players
HC Bílí Tygři Liberec players
Ice hockey people from Brno
National Hockey League first-round draft picks
New Jersey Devils draft picks
New Jersey Devils players
Sarnia Sting players